The Paris Observatory, a research institution of the Paris Sciences et Lettres University, is the foremost astronomical observatory of France, and one of the largest astronomical centers in the world. Its historic building is on the Left Bank of the Seine in central Paris, but most of the staff work on a satellite campus in Meudon, a suburb southwest of Paris.

The Paris Observatory was founded in 1667. Construction was completed by the early 1670s and coincided with a major push for increased science, and the founding of the Royal Academy of Sciences. King Louis XIV's minister of finance organized a "scientific powerhouse" to increase understanding of astronomy, maritime navigation, and science in general.

Through the centuries the Paris Observatory has continued in support of astronomical activities, and in the 21st century connects multiple sites and organizations, supporting astronomy and science, past and present.

Constitution

Administratively, it is a grand établissement of the French Ministry of National Education, with a status close to that of a public university. Its missions include:
 research in astronomy and astrophysics;
 education (four graduate programs, Ph.D. studies);
 diffusion of knowledge to the public.

It maintains a solar observatory at Meudon and a radio astronomy observatory at Nançay.
It was also the home to the International Time Bureau until its dissolution in 1987.

The Paris Observatory Library, which was founded in 1785, provides the researchers with documentation and preserves the ancient books, archives, and heritage collections of the institution. Many collections are available online.

History

The Paris Observatory was proposed in 1665-1666 by the French Academy of Sciences, which had recently been founded by the Minister of Finance Jean-Baptiste Colbert. In 1666, King Louis XIV authorized the building of the Observatory. On Midsummer's Day 1667, members of the Academy of Sciences traced the future building's outline on a plot outside town near the Port Royal abbey, with the Paris meridian exactly bisecting the site north–south. The meridian line was used as a basis for navigation and would be used by French cartographers as their prime meridian for more than 200 years.

The Paris Observatory predates by a few years the Royal Greenwich Observatory in England, which was founded in 1675. The English philosopher John Locke visited the Paris Observatory on 28 August 1677, which he recorded in his journal: "At the Observatory we saw the Moon in a twenty-two foot glass, and Jupiter, with his satellites, in the same. The most remote was on the east, and the other three on the west. We also saw Saturn and his ring, in a twelve-foot glass, and one of his satellites. Monsieur Cassini told me, that the declination of the needle at Paris is about two and a half degrees to the west."

The architect of the Paris Observatory was Claude Perrault whose brother, Charles, was secretary to Jean-Baptiste Colbert and superintendent of public works.  Optical instruments were supplied by Giuseppe Campani. Construction of the Observatory was completed in 1671, though the buildings were extended in 1730, 1810, 1834, 1850, and 1951. The last extension incorporates the Meridian Room designed by Jean Prouvé.

Accomplishments
In 1671 Saturn's Moon Iapetus was discovered, and Rhea in 1672, from the Paris Observatory. In 1684 Dione and Tethys were discovered also.

In 1676 the staff concluded that light itself was travelling at a finite speed.

The world's first national almanac, the Connaissance des temps, was published by the Observatory in 1679, using eclipses in Jupiter's satellites to aid sea-farers in establishing longitude. In 1863, the observatory published the first modern weather maps. In 1882, a  astrographic lens was constructed, an instrument that catalysed what proved to be the over-ambitious international Carte du Ciel project.

In November 1913, the Paris Observatory, using the Eiffel Tower as an antenna, exchanged sustained wireless (radio) signals with the United States Naval Observatory in Washington, D.C. to determine the exact difference of longitude between the two institutions.

Heritage 
The Paris Observatory library preserves a great number of original works and letters of the Observatory and well known astronomers. The entire collection has been inventoried in an online archive called Alidade - Accès en Ligne aux Instruments, Documents et Archives De l’astronomiE (Online Access to Instruments, Documents and Archives of Astronomy). Some of the work is now digitized on the digital library such as those of Johannes Hevelius, Jérôme Lalande and Joseph-Nicolas Delisle.

Directors and staff
The title of Director of the Observatory was officially given for the first time to César-François Cassini de Thury by a Royal brevet dated November 12, 1771. However, the important role played by his grandfather and father in this institution during its first century actually gave them somewhat the role of Director.

The observatory did not have a recognised Director until 1771, before that each member could do as they pleased. Sometimes Giovanni Cassini (1671–1712) and  Jacques Cassini (1712–1756) are listed as "Directors" retrospectively. The same goes for Francois Arago, who also was not actually a Director although he did have a de facto position of leadership and is often credited as such.

The current President of the Observatory is Fabienne Casoli. 

 César-François Cassini de Thury (1756–1784)
 Dominique, comte de Cassini (1784–1793)
 Joseph Jérôme Lefrançais de Lalande (1795–1800)
 Pierre Méchain (1800–1804)
 Jean Baptiste Joseph Delambre (1804–1822)
 Alexis Bouvard (1822–1843)
 François Arago (1843–1853)
 Urbain Le Verrier (1854–1870)
 Charles-Eugène Delaunay (1870–1873)
 Urbain Le Verrier (1873–1877)
 Amédée Mouchez (1878–1892)
 Félix Tisserand (1892–1896)
 Maurice Loewy (1896–1907)
 Benjamin Baillaud (1908–1926)

 Henri-Alexandre Deslandres (1926–1929)
 Ernest Esclangon (1929–1944)
 André Danjon (1945–1963)
 Jean-François Denisse (1963–1967)
 Jean Delhaye (1967–1971)
 Raymond Michard (1971–1976)
 Jacques Boulon (1976–1981)
 Pierre Charvin (1981–1991)
 Michel Combes (1991–1999)
 Pierre Couturier (1999–2003)
 Daniel Egret (2003-2011)
 Claude Catala (2011–2020)
 Fabienne Casoli (2020–present)

Facilities 

The first site was the Paris headquarters established in 1667 by King Louis XIV of France. This facility had various work done on it over the centuries, and in 1927 the Meudon Observatory was added, which included a new site and facilities. It was built in 1891.

In addition to these sites, the Marseilles Observatory became a branch of the Paris Observatory in 1863. In 1873 Marseilles Observatory detached from Paris Observatory.

Paris 

King Louis XIV purchased the land for his new observatory in March 1667. This provided a site for the activities of the Academy of Sciences near to the city of Paris.
The original buildings was designed by Claude Perrault.
A dome and terrace was added in 1847.

Meudon 

The Meudon site was constructed in the late 19th century by Jules Janssen, one of the discoverers of helium. With a million francs and permission to build on the old royal palace ruins, he constructed one of the grandest observatories of its day, with a focus on astronomy and solar physics. After World War One, the observatory was integrated with the nearby Paris Observatory and it became an important campus for that observatory. Even into the 21st century solar observations are conducted at the Meudon site, and the preserved Great Refractor (Grande lunette) and astronomical gardens overlooking the city of Paris have delighted visitors for decades. The site includes:
 Solar Observatory Tower Meudon
 Chateau de Meudon
 LESIA space and astrophysics instrumentation research laboratory

Nançay 

After the Second World War, French astronomers began designing and building instruments for radio astronomy. A field station was established in 1953, and by the late 1950s several radio instruments were established.
In 1965 the Nançay radio telescope was established, a design equivalent to an almost 100-metre dish.

Saint-Véran 
Also known as the Observatoire du Pic de Château Renard, the Observatoire de Saint-Véran was built in 1974 on top of the Pic de Château Renard, in the commune of Saint-Véran in the Haut Queyras (Hautes Alpes département). A coronograph was in operation there for ten years; the dome was moved there from the Perrault building of the Observatoire de Paris.

Nowadays, the AstroQueyras amateur astronomy association operates the facility, using a  telescope on loan from the Observatoire de Haute Provence. Numerous asteroids have been discovered there.

Instruments past and present

Early telescopes were supplied by the famed craftsman Giuseppe Campani. Cassini, an astronomer who worked in the early days of the Observatory, had used Campani's telescopes in the 1660s, and continued to do so when he moved to the Paris Observatory.

The Marly tower, moved to the observatory in 1685 for mounting telescopes, was demolished in 1705. The Marly tower was originally made for the Versailles water supply system (see Machine de Marly), but was moved to the southern gardens area near the Paris Observatory. The tower could hold the objective lens for extremely long focal length aerial telescopes.

In 1732 a quadrant instrument made by Langlois was established at the Observatory.

In 1804 a telescope of 8.4 cm aperture, made by Bellet, was established on the roof of the observatory. In 1807 a Short reflector telescope was acquired, and there were several instruments available including a 9 cm aperture Dollond telescope, and a telescope by Lerebours.

One of the special telescopes in the collection of the observatory, was the Passy telescope of King Louis XV. This telescope was built by Dom Noel in the late 18th century, and was a reflecting telescope with a 61 cm aperture bronze mirror. In 1805 the mirror was re-polished, but it was tarnished again within two years; it remained at the Observatory until it was dismantled in 1841.

A Lerebours telescope of 24.4 cm aperture was installed in 1823, at a cost of 14,500 Francs. In 1835 Arago used this telescope to observe the return of Halley's Comet that year.

In 1837 the Gambey mural circle was installed, and also a transit instrument, also by Gambey.

In 1857 a refracting telescope of  aperture objective, the Arago equatorial telescope, was completed. This telescope was proposed by director François Arago in 1846. It was installed in the east tower and was made by Lerebours. This instrument is known to have conducted photometry measurements of Jupiter's moons (there were only four known at that time) in the late 1880s.

In 1863 a large transit circle was installed, and in 1878 a meridian instrument. The transit circle of 1863 was made by Secretan and Eichens.

In 1875 a 120 cm aperture silver-on-glass reflecting telescope was built, for 400,000 francs (the French unit of currency at that time).

This 120 cm diameter aperture telescope was a silvered glass mirror polished by Martin. However, when it was mounted it was realized the gravity altered its shape because of the mirror's weight, thus causing an image quality issue.

In 1886 a Henry astrograph with 13-inch objective was acquired.

For the 1907 Transit of Mercury, some of the telescopes used at the Paris Observatory included:

 Foucault-Eichens reflector ( aperture)
 Foucault-Eichens reflector ( aperture)
 Martin-Eichens reflector ( aperture)
 Several small refractors

The telescopes were mobile and were placed on the terrace for the observations.

Meudon 83-cm Great Refractor

The Meudon great refractor (Meudon 83-cm) is an  aperture refractor, which, with September 20, 1909 observations by E. M. Antoniadi, helped disprove the Mars canals theory. It is a double telescope completed in 1891, with a secondary  aperture lens for photography. It was of the largest refracting telescopes in Europe, and was active for a century until 1991. In the 21st century it was renovated and supports public education and visitation.

The Meudon refractor was built at Meudon Observatory. It is one of three sites of the Paris Observatory; Meudon Observatory became part of the Paris Observatory in 1926. The Meudon Great refractor is the third largest astronomical refractor of its type in the world. The Meudon refractor is located in the Grande Coupole building, which was renovated in the early 2000s.

See also
 Bureau des Longitudes
 List of astronomical observatories
 List of largest optical refracting telescopes

References

Bibliography
 [Anon.] (2001) "Paris Observatory", Encyclopædia Britannica, Deluxe CDROM edition

External links

 Paris Observatory (official site, in English)
 Location in Paris
 Inventory of astronomy heritage
 Digital library for astronomy archives
 Publications of the Observatoire de Paris in Gallica, the digital library of the BnF (in French)

 
Grands établissements
Astronomical observatories in France
Buildings and structures in the 14th arrondissement of Paris
1671 establishments in France